A peculiarity of thermal motion of very long linear macromolecules in  entangled polymer melts or concentrated polymer solutions is reptation. Derived from the word reptile, reptation suggests the movement of entangled polymer chains as being analogous to snakes slithering through one another. Pierre-Gilles de Gennes introduced (and named) the concept of reptation into polymer physics in 1971 to explain the dependence of the mobility of a macromolecule on its length. Reptation is used as a mechanism to explain viscous flow in an amorphous polymer. Sir Sam Edwards and Masao Doi later refined reptation theory. Similar phenomena also occur in proteins.

Two closely related concepts are reptons and entanglement. A repton is a mobile point residing in the cells of a lattice, connected by bonds. Entanglement means the topological restriction of molecular motion by other chains.

Theory and mechanism

Reptation theory describes the effect of polymer chain entanglements on the relationship between molecular mass and chain relaxation time. The theory predicts that, in entangled systems, the relaxation time  is proportional to the cube of molecular mass, : . The prediction of the theory can be arrived at by a relatively simple argument. First, each polymer chain is envisioned as occupying a tube of length , through which it may move with snake-like motion (creating new sections of tube as it moves). Thus, we define the tube mobility as
,
where  is the velocity of the chain when it is pulled by a force, .  will be inversely proportional to the degree of polymerization (and thus also inversely proportional to chain weight).

The diffusivity of the chain through the tube may then be written as
.
By then recalling that in 1-dimension the mean squared displacement due to Brownian motion is given by
,
we obtain
.
The time necessary for a polymer chain to displace the length of its original tube is then
. 
By noting that this time is comparable to the relaxation time, we establish that . Since the length of the tube is proportional to the degree of polymerization, and μtube is inversely proportional to the degree of polymerization, we observe that  (and so ).

From the preceding analysis, we see that molecular mass has a very strong effect on relaxation time in entangled polymer systems. Indeed, this is significantly different from the untangled case, where relaxation time is observed to be proportional to molecular mass. This strong effect can be understood by recognizing that, as chain length increases, the number of tangles present will dramatically increase. These tangles serve to reduce chain mobility. The corresponding increase in relaxation time can result in viscoelastic behavior, which is often observed in polymer melts. Note that 
the polymer’s zero-shear viscosity gives an approximation of the actual observed dependency, ; this relaxation time has nothing to do with the reptation relaxation time.

Models

Entangled polymers are characterized with effective internal scale, commonly known as the length of macromolecule between adjacent entanglements .

Entanglements with other polymer chains restrict polymer chain motion to a thin virtual tube passing through the restrictions. Without breaking polymer chains to allow the restricted chain to pass through it, the chain must be pulled or flow through the restrictions. The mechanism for movement of the chain through these restrictions is called reptation.

In the blob model, the polymer chain is made up of  Kuhn lengths of individual length . The chain is assumed to form blobs between each entanglement, containing  Kuhn length segments in each. The mathematics of random walks can show that the average end-to-end distance of a section of a polymer chain, made up of  Kuhn lengths is
. Therefore if there are  total Kuhn lengths, and  blobs on a particular chain:

The total end-to-end length of the restricted chain  is then:

This is the average length a polymer molecule must diffuse to escape from its particular tube, and so the characteristic time for this to happen can be calculated using diffusive equations. A classical derivation gives the reptation time :

The linear macromolecules reptate if the length of macromolecule  is bigger than the critical entanglement molecular weight .  is 1.4 to 3.5 times .

The conditions of existence of reptation in the thermal motion of macromolecules of complex architecture (macromolecules in the form of branch, star, comb and others) have not been established yet.

The dynamics of shorter chains or of long chains at short times is usually described by the Rouse model.

See also
 Important publications in polymer physics
 Polymer characterization
 Polymer physics
 Protein dynamics
 Soft matter

References 

Polymer physics
Materials science
Polymers
1971 introductions